The elections were held on 14 May 1971, with one third up for vote. Since the previous election, a by-election in November for Burngreave seen the Liberals increase their representation to two, with a gain from Labour.

Immediately following last year's election, the allocation of fourteen retiring Alderman was decided, with Labour taking the overwhelming majority, strengthened by their election performance and the knowledge that if repeated it would lead to a landslide victory for them.

Labour leader Ironmongers' prediction of an aforementioned landslide played out in this election, with Labour making over a dozen gains, with all-but-one coming from their competitor the Conservatives - the other being a Liberal seat in Heeley won in a by-election in 1969. This left them with a record number of 80 seats, and a similarly record-breaking majority of 52.

With such heavy losses, numerous high-profile Conservative councillors lost their seat, not least of which was a contender for the group's leadership, Irvine Patnick.

Election result

The result had the following consequences for the total number of seats on the Council after the elections:

Ward results

References

1971 English local elections
1971
1970s in Sheffield